The Chairperson is the highest-ranking official in a rural municipal government in Nepal. There are in total 460 chairpersons in Nepal.

Overview

List of chairpersons of RM in Nepal (2022–2027)

Province No. 1

Madhesh Province

Bagmati Province

Gandaki Province

Lumbini Province

Karnali Province

Sudurpashchim Province

See also 

 2022 Nepalese local elections
 List of mayors of municipalities in Nepal
 Rural municipality

External links

References 

Chairpersons